Schönbüel is a prominence east of the Höch Gumme in the Emmental Alps. It can be accessed by cable car from Lungern.

References

External links
 Schönbüel on Hikr

Mountains of the Alps
Mountains of Obwalden
Cable cars in Switzerland
Emmental Alps
Mountains of Switzerland